Soil acidification is the buildup of hydrogen cations, which reduces the soil pH. Chemically, this happens when a proton donor gets added to the soil. The donor can be an acid, such as nitric acid, sulfuric acid, or carbonic acid. It can also be a compound such as aluminium sulfate, which reacts in the soil to release protons. Acidification also occurs when base cations such as calcium, magnesium, potassium and sodium are leached from the soil.

Soil acidification naturally occurs as lichens and algae begin to break down rock surfaces. Acids continue with this dissolution as soil develops. With time and weathering, soils become more acidic in natural ecosystems. Soil acidification rates can vary, and increase with certain factors such as acid rain, agriculture, and pollution.

Causes

Acid rain
Rainfall is naturally acidic due to carbonic acid forming from carbon dioxide in the atmosphere. This compound causes rainfall pH to be around 5.0-5.5. When rainfall has a lower pH than natural levels, it can cause rapid acidification of soil. Sulfur dioxide and nitrogen oxides are precursors of stronger acids that can lead to acid rain production when they react with water in the atmosphere. These gases may be present in the atmosphere due to natural sources such as lightning and volcanic eruptions, or from anthropogenic emissions. Basic cations like calcium are leached from the soil as acidic rainfall flows, which allows aluminum and proton levels to increase.

Nitric and sulfuric acids in acid rain and snow can have different effects on the acidification of forest soils, particularly seasonally in regions where a snow pack may accumulate during the winter. Snow tends to contain more nitric acid than sulfuric acid, and as a result, a pulse of nitric acid-rich snow meltwater may leach through high elevation forest soils during a short time in the spring. This volume of water may comprise as much as 50% of the annual precipitation. The nitric acid flush of meltwater may cause a sharp, short term, decrease in the drainage water pH entering groundwater and surface waters.  The decrease in pH can solubilize  Al3+ that is toxic to fish, especially newly-hatched fry with immature gill systems through which they pass large volumes of water to obtain O2 for respiration. As the snow meltwater flush passes, water temperatures rise, and lakes and streams produce more dissolved organic matter; the Al concentration in drainage water decreases and is bound to organic acids, making it less toxic to fish.  In rain, the ratio of nitric-to-sulfuric acids decreases to approximately 1:2.  The higher sulfuric acid content of rain also may not release as much Al3+ from soils as does nitric acid, in part due to the retention (adsorption) of SO42- by soils. This process releases OH− into soil solution and buffers the pH decrease caused by the added H+ from both acids. The forest floor organic soil horizons (layers) that are high in organic matter also buffer pH, and decrease the load of H+ that subsequently leaches through underlying mineral horizons.

Biological weathering

Plant roots acidify soil by releasing protons and organic acids so as to chemically weather soil minerals. Decaying remains of dead plants on soil may also form organic acids which contribute to soil acidification. Acidification from leaf litter on the O-horizon is more pronounced under coniferous trees such as pine, spruce and fir, which return fewer base cations to the soil, rather than under deciduous trees; however, soil pH differences attributed to vegetation often preexisted that vegetation, and help select for species which tolerate them. Calcium accumulation in existing biomass also strongly affects soil pH - a factor which can vary from species to species.

Parent materials
Certain parent materials also contribute to soil acidification. Granites and their allied igneous rocks are called "acidic" because they have a lot of free quartz, which produces silicic acid on weathering. Also, they have relatively low amounts of calcium and magnesium. Some sedimentary rocks such as shale and coal are rich in sulfides, which, when hydrated and oxidized, produce sulfuric acid which is much stronger than silicic acid. Many coal soils are too acidic to support vigorous plant growth, and coal gives off strong precursors to acid rain when it is burned. Marine clays are also sulfide-rich in many cases, and such clays become very acidic if they are drained to an oxidizing state. ;)

Soil amendments
Soil amendments such as fertilizers and manures can cause soil acidification. Sulfur based fertilizers can be highly acidifying, examples include elemental sulfur and iron sulfate  while others like potassium sulfate have no significant effect on soil pH. While most nitrogen fertilizers have an acidifying effect, ammonium-based nitrogen fertilizers are more acidifying than other nitrogen sources. Ammonia-based nitrogen fertilizers include ammonium sulfate, diammonium phosphate, monoammonium phosphate, and ammonium nitrate. Organic nitrogen sources, such as urea and compost, are less acidifying. Nitrate sources which have little or no ammonium, such as calcium nitrate, magnesium nitrate, potassium nitrate, and sodium nitrate, are not acidifying.

Pollution 
Acidification may also occur from nitrogen emissions into the air, as the nitrogen may end up deposited into the soil. Animal livestock is responsible for nearly 65 percent of man-made ammonia emissions.

Anthropogenic sources of sulfur dioxides and nitrogen oxides play a major role in  increase of  acid rain production. The use of fossil fuels and motor exhaust are the largest anthropogenic contributors to sulfuric gases and nitrogen oxides, respectively.

Aluminum is one of the few elements capable of making soil more acidic. This is achieved by aluminum taking hydroxide ions out of water, leaving hydrogen ions behind. As a result, the soil is more acidic, which makes it unlivable for many plants. Another consequence of aluminum in soils is aluminum toxicity, which inhibits root growth.

Agriculture management practices 
Agriculture managements approaches such as monoculture and chemical fertilization often leads to soil problems such as soil acidification, degradation, and soil-borne diseases, which ultimately have a negative impact on agricultural productivity and sustainability.

Effects

Soil acidification can cause damage to plants and organisms in the soil. In plants, soil acidification results in smaller, less durable roots. Acidic soils sometimes damage the root tips reducing further growth. Plant height is impaired and seed germination also decreases. Soil acidification impacts plant health, resulting in reduced cover and lower plant density. Overall, stunted growth is seen in plants. Soil acidification is directly linked to a decline in endangered species of plants.

In the soil, acidification reduces microbial and macrofaunal diversity.  This can reduce soil structure decline which makes it more sensitive to erosion. There are less nutrients available in the soil, larger impact of toxic elements to plants, and consequences to soil biological functions (such as nitrogen fixation). A recent study showed that sugarcane monoculture induces soil acidity, reduces soil fertility, shifts microbial structure, and reduces its activity. Furthermore, most beneficial bacterial genera decreased significantly due to sugarcane monoculture, while beneficial fungal genera showed a reverse trend. Therefore, mitigating soil acidity, improving soil fertility, and soil enzymatic activities, including improved microbial structure with beneficial service to plants and soil, can be an effective measure to develop a sustainable sugarcane cropping system.

At a larger scale, soil acidification is linked to losses in agricultural productivity due to these effects.

Impacts of acidic water and Soil acidification on plants could be minor or in most cases major. In minor cases which do not result in fatality of plant life include; less-sensitive plants to acidic conditions and or less potent acid rain. Also in minor cases the plant will eventually die due to the acidic water lowering the plants natural pH. Acidic water enters the plant and causes important plant minerals to dissolve and get carried away; which ultimately causes the plant to die of lack of minerals for nutrition. In major cases which are more extreme; the same process of damage occurs as in minor cases, which is removal of essential minerals, but at a much quicker rate. Likewise, acid rain that falls on soil and on plant leaves causes drying of the waxy leaf cuticle; which ultimately causes rapid water loss from the plant to the outside atmosphere and results in death of the plant. To see if a plant is being affected by soil acidification, one can closely observe the plant leaves. If the leaves are green and look healthy, the soil pH is normal and acceptable for plant life. But if the plant leaves have yellowing between the veins on their leaves, that means the plant is suffering from acidification and is unhealthy. Moreover, a plant suffering from soil acidification cannot photosynthesize. Drying out of the plant due to acidic water destroy chloroplast organelles. Without being able to photosynthesize a plant cannot create nutrients for its own survival or oxygen for the survival of aerobic organisms; which affects most species of Earth and ultimately end the purpose of the plants existence.

Prevention and management 
Soil acidification is a common issue in long-term crop production which can be reduced by lime, organic amendments (e.g., straw and manure) and biochar application. In sugarcane, soybean and corn crops grown in acidic soils, lime application resulted in nutrient restoration, increase in soil pH, increase in root biomass, and better plant health.

Different management strategies may also be applied to prevent further acidification: using less acidifying fertilizers, considering fertilizer amount and application timing to reduce nitrate-nitrogen leaching, good irrigation management with acid-neutralizing water, and considering the ratio of basic nutrients to nitrogen in harvested crops. Sulfur fertilizers should only be used in responsive crops, with a high rate of crop recovery.

Through reduction of anthropogenic sources of sulfur dioxides, nitrogen oxides, and with air-pollution control measures, let us try to reduce acid rain and soil acidification all over the world.

This has been observed in Ontario, Canada over their several lakes and demonstrated improvements in water pH and alkalinity.

See also
Acid sulfate soil
Alkali soil
Freshwater acidification
Ocean acidification

References

Further reading

acidification, soil
Environmental issues with soil
Soil degradation